The rendezvous fish (Polymetme corythaeola) is a species of fish in the family Phosichthyidae (lightfish). 

Its specific name is derived from the Greek κόρυθος (korythos, "helmet"); and αἰόλος (aiolos, "glittering").

Description

The rendezvous fish has a dark dorsum, with silver flanks and a black pigment on the outer caudal rays. Its length is maximum . It has a large mouth and medium-sized eyes. It has two rows of photophores on its body. It has 10–14 dorsal soft rays, 27–34 anal soft rays and 43–45 vertebrae. It has an adipose fin.

Habitat

The rendezvous fish is benthopelagic, living in coastal waters worldwide.

References

Platytroctidae
Fish described in 1898
Taxa named by Alfred William Alcock